Homash may refer to:
 Scarf in ornamental style used by belly dancers 
 Homash (Palestine), a community

See also
 Homesh, an Israeli settlement in the West Bank established in 1978 and closed in 2005